The surname Feiner may refer to:

Irving Feiner, plaintiff in  Feiner v. New York
Leon Feiner, Polish-Jewish lawyer, political activist
Michael Feiner, Swedish musician
Steven K. Feiner, American computer scientist
William Feiner, German Jesuit missionary
Yehiel Feiner, birth name of Yehiel De-Nur, Jewish writer, Holocaust survivor

See also

German-language surnames
Yiddish-language surnames